George Houvardas is an Australian actor who is best known for his role as Nick "Carbo" Karandonis in the television series Packed to the Rafters.

Biography
Houvardas is the son of Anastasia (a teacher) and Michael (an accountant) and has two brothers, Steve and Tony (fat Tony) Houvardas.

Houvardas is a graduate of Screenwise drama school and works part-time, along with his brothers, at his family's restaurant in McMahons Point, Sydney.

Houvardas’s school years saw many sporting achievements reached. From years 7 to 10, he was the school marathon champion. He also won Goalkeeper of the Year (in his first year as a goalkeeper) at school and played in the NSW State Championships.

Career
From 2008 to 2013 he played Nick "Carbo" Karandonis in Packed to the Rafters. This was his first acting role after his first audition.

In 2009 Houvardas had a guest role in the second season of East West 101.

Houvardas appeared on Season 10 of the Seven Network reality show Dancing with the Stars in 2010.

Filmography 

Back to the Rafters

Television

Film

Radio
In February, 2011, Houvardas filled in on The Kyle & Jackie O Show alongside fellow Packed To The Rafters star Hugh Sheridan.

Awards and nominations

References

External links

 Packed to the Rafters Official Website > Cast :: George Houvardas
 George Houvardas on TV.com
 George Houvardas - zimbio

Australian male television actors
Living people
Male actors from Sydney
Australian people of Greek descent
Year of birth missing (living people)